Bishopdale is a dale in the Yorkshire Dales National Park in North Yorkshire, England. Bishopdale is also the name of a civil parish, which includes only the sparsely populated upper reaches of the dale, from the head of the dale as far downstream as Howesyke and Howgill Gill.

Geography

There are three villages in the dale, all in its lower part:  West Burton, Thoralby and Newbiggin. The B6160 road follows the path of the river from its junction with the A684 to the watershed at Kidstones Pass where it continues to Cray and Buckden in Upper Wharfedale. The highest point in the dale is to be found at  about two thirds of the way up Buckden Pike.

The dale is divided between four civil parishes, Bishopdale, Newbiggin, Thoralby and the northern part of Burton-cum-Walden (which includes the largest village, West Burton), all in the district of Richmondshire.  The populations of the four parishes were estimated in 2012 at:
{|
| Bishopdale   ||  30
|-
| Newbiggin   ||  80
|-
| Thoralby   ||  160
|-
| Burton-cum-Walden  ||  290
|}

Civil parish of Bishopdale 
Bishopdale civil parish includes only the sparsely populated upper reaches of the dale.  It extends from the head of the dale as far downstream as Howesyke and Howgill Gill.  The civil parish of Bishopdale was a township of the ancient parish of Aysgarth, and became a separate civil parish in 1866.  It now shares a grouped parish council, the Aysgarth & District Parish Council, with Aysgarth, Newbiggin, Thoralby and Thornton Rust.

References

External links

Bishopdale

Civil parishes in North Yorkshire
Yorkshire Dales
Wensleydale